The protected areas of Angola include national parks, partial nature reserves, integral nature reserves, and regional nature parks. As of mid-2020, protected areas 87,507 km, or 7% of Angola's land area.

National parks
(IUCN protected area category II)

 Iona National Park (15,150 km²) est. 1964
 Quiçama National Park (9,960 km²) est. 1957
 Cameia National Park (14,450 km²) est. 1938
 Bicuar National Park (7,900 km²) est. 1964
 Cangandala National Park (630 km²) est. 1970
 Mupa National Park (6,600 km²) est. 1964
 Luengue-Luiana National Park (22,610 km²) est. 1966
 Mavinga National Park (5,950 km²) est. 1966

Integral nature reserves
(IUCN protected area category IV)
 Ilheu dos Passaros Integral Nature Reserve (2 km²) est. 1973
 Luando Integral Nature Reserve (8280 km²)	est. 1957

Partial reserves
(IUCN protected area category IV)
 Buffalo Partial Reserve (400 km²) est. 1974
 Namibe Partial Reserve (4,450 km²) est. 1960

Regional nature parks
(IUCN protected area category V)
  Chimalavera Regional Nature Park (100 km²) est. 1974

References

 
protected areas
Nature conservation in Angola
Angola
Protected areas